Thórhallsson or Þórhallsson may refer to:

Baldur Thorhallsson, Professor at the University of Iceland
Dagur Dan Þórhallsson (born 2000), Icelandic football midfielder
Höskuldur Þórhallsson (born 1973), Icelandic politician, former member of the Althing
Magnús Þórhallsson, Icelandic priest and scribe
Ragnar Þórhallsson (born 1987), Icelandic musician
Thorlac Thorhallsson (Saint Thorlak) (1133–1193), the patron saint of Iceland
Throstur Thorhallsson (born 1969), Icelandic chess grandmaster
Tryggvi Þórhallsson (1889–1935), prime minister of Iceland 1927–1932